De Jesús, De Jesus or capitalized as de Jesús, de Jesus is a Spanish and Portuguese surname (meaning of Jesus) and a common family name in the Hispanic and Portuguese-speaking world. In the year 2000, there were 26,336 people of Hispanic/Latino origin in the United States with the surname De Jesus, making 172nd in order of frequency for all Hispanic/Latino surnames, and 1,002nd most common surname in the U.S. A decade later in 2010, the U.S. Census Bureau surveyed 44,038 people with the last name Dejesus, making it the 783rd most common surname in the U.S. DeJesus is found throughout Latin America, but most prevalent in Brazil with nearly 2,000,000 bearers with second place going to Mexico. In the Philippines, De Jesus (or de Jesus) is the 33rd most common surname, held by about 1.1% of the population.

The surname is found most frequently in the following three countries:
 Brazil. 1,963,741
 Mexico. 136,454
 Philippines. 79,480

People
Infanta Ana de Jesus Maria of Braganza, Portuguese princess
Adolfo de Jesús Constanzo, American serial killer, occultist, and drug trafficker 
Alex de Jesús, Puerto Rican professional boxer
Ángel De Jesús, Dominican baseball player
Benjamin de Jesus (1940–1997), assassinated Philippine bishop 
Carlos DeJesus, radio and  television personality
David DeJesus, American Major League Baseball player
Esteban de Jesús, Puerto Rican world lightweight champion boxer
Fábio de Jesus, Brazilian footballer
Francisco de Jesus, Brazilian boxer
Gabriel Fernando de Jesus, Brazilian footballer
Gina DeJesus, American abduction survivor
Gregoria de Jesús, part of the Philippine Revolution
Iván DeJesús, Major League Baseball player from Puerto Rico
Iván DeJesús Jr., Puerto Rican professional baseball player
José DeJesús, Puerto Rican Major League Baseball player
José Corazón de Jesús, also known as Huseng Batute, a Filipino poet
José de Jesús Corona, Mexican international football goalkeeper
José Luis de Jesús, founder and leader of Creciendo en Gracia
Rick DeJesus, lead singer of band Adelitas Way
Roberto de Jesús, beach volleyball player from Dominican Republic
Robenílson de Jesus, boxer from Brazil
Robin de Jesús, Puerto Rican film and theatre actor
Sophina DeJesus, American gymnast
Vincent de Jesus, Philippine composer, arranger and musical director
Wanda De Jesus, American actress

References

Spanish-language surnames
Portuguese-language surnames
Surnames of Spanish origin